is a Japanese voice actor who is affiliated with Aksent.

Notable anime and video game voice roles
Ryu in Street Fighter Zero, Street Fighter Zero 2, Street Fighter EX series
Dan Hibiki in Street Fighter Zero
Yamada in Revolutionary Girl Utena
Milluki Zoldyck in Hunter × Hunter (1999)
Arias in Read or Die
Koji Mori in Strawberry Eggs
Tamanian Kid in Beast Wars Second
Masatsugu in Grander Musashi RV
Rodrigo in Hungry Heart: Wild Striker
Ninja Tottori and Yamagishi in Papuwa

External links
 
 

1970 births
Living people
Japanese male voice actors